San Marcos is a municipality in El Salvador. It is located in a small valley, 5 miles (8 km) southeast of downtown San Salvador. It has a population of 63,209. San Marcos is one of the 14 municipalities which make up the Metropolitan Area of San Salvador, also known as Greater San Salvador.

Geography
The city's geography is characterized by numerous small hills, as well as its proximity to Mount San Jacinto to the north and Planes de Renderos hills to the south. Most of San Marcos is a residential suburb with many middle-income and low-income dwellings. The city is the main gateway for air travelers because it is bordered by the Comalapa Highway (RN-5 (Autopista Comalapa)), the freeway that connects El Salvador International Airport with San Salvador.

Economy
Not much commerce exists outside the municipal public market and the southeast bus station, however, there is a significant textile industry in the San Marcos Free Trade Zone, and logistic/distribution companies along the Comalapa Highway. The city's per capita GDP(PPP) is US $5,480 and it has a Human Development Index of 0.759 as of 2002.

References

Municipalities of the San Salvador Department